Nicholas Postgate (1596 or 1597 – 7 August 1679) was an English Catholic priest who was executed for treason on the Knavesmire in York on 6 August 1679 as part of the anti-Catholic persecution that was sweeping England at that time. He is one of the 85 English Catholic Martyrs of England and Wales beatified by Pope John Paul II in November 1987.

Early life and priesthood
Postgate was born at Kirkdale House, Egton, Yorkshire, England. He entered Douay College, in France, 11 July 1621. He took the college oath on 12 March 1623, received minor orders, 23 December 1624, the subdiaconate, 18 December 1627, the diaconate, 18 March 1628, and the priesthood two days later. He was sent to the mission on 29 June 1630, and worked in England for the Catholic religion, finally settling back to Ugthorpe, not far from his birthplace, in the 1660s. His parish, which was known by the extinct name of Blackamoor, extended between Guisborough, Pickering and Scarborough. Thomas Ward, who later wrote about him, knew him well. He was exceptionally conscientious in performing his pastoral duties: the historian J.P. Kenyon remarks that "for nearly half a century he tramped the high moors of North Yorkshire and the  plains of the Holderness, ministering to a scattered flock".

Background to arrest
Although anti-Catholic feeling in England had subsided a good deal at that time, it flared up again due to the fake Popish Plot of 1678; this followed a false testimony from Titus Oates in which he claimed there was a conspiracy to install a Catholic king, and he managed to foment a renewed and fierce persecution of English Catholics. It was to be the last time that Catholics were put to death in England for their faith; one of the last victims - but not the very last - was Nicholas Postgate.

During the panic engineered by Oates, a prominent Protestant magistrate in London, Sir Edmund Berry Godfrey, was murdered and Oates loudly blamed the Catholics; Sir Edmund's manservant, John Reeves, set out to get his revenge. For reasons which are not clear, he decided to base his actions in the Whitby area, possibly because he knew that priests arrived there from France.

Arrest and execution
Nicholas Postgate was apprehended by the exciseman Reeves while carrying out a baptism at the house of Matthew Lyth, Little Beck, near Whitby. Reeves, with a colleague called William Cockerill, raided the house during the ceremony and caught the priest, then aged 82. Lyth had apparently spoken publicly about the ceremony, thus accidentally alerting the authorities to Postgate's presence. Postgate was condemned under the Jesuits, etc. Act 1584, (27 Elizabeth, c. 2), for being a priest on English soil. He was hanged, disembowelled and quartered at the Knavesmire, York. His quarters were given to his friends and interred. One of the hands was sent to Douay College. On the scaffold he said that he was too old and frail to make long speeches: he would simply die for the Catholic faith to which he had devoted his life.

Reeves was listed in a treasury book as having been paid 22 shillings for his apprehension of Postgate but some believe he did not receive the money before he committed suicide by drowning.

Nicholas Postgate's legacy
Postgate's portable altar stone hangs at the front of the altar at Saint Joseph's Catholic Church, Pickering, where it is now venerated.

Every year since 1974 an open-air service has been held – alternately in Egton Bridge and Ugthorpe – in his honour, and the pub in Egton Bridge is called 'The Postgate" in his honour.

Since the name is uncommon, he is probably related to the Postgate family who had many notable members from the 19th century onwards.

The Postgate Society aims to spread knowledge of Nicholas Postgate and promote interest in Catholic history during penal times.

A group of 27 Catholic schools across Teesside and North Yorkshire, the Nicholas Postgate Catholic Academy Trust, is also named in his honour.

See also
 Douai Martyrs

References

Ward England's Reformation (London, 1747), 200
Challoner, Missionary Priests, II, no. 204
Gillow, Bibl. Dict. Eng. Cath.

External links

In Father Postgate's steps; article in the Gazette and Herald

1590s births
1679 deaths
English College, Douai alumni
Martyred Roman Catholic priests
Victims of the Popish Plot
People from the Borough of Scarborough
17th-century English Roman Catholic priests
People executed by Stuart England by hanging, drawing and quartering
17th-century Roman Catholic martyrs
Executed people from North Yorkshire
English beatified people
Eighty-five martyrs of England and Wales
People executed under the Stuarts for treason against England